The Odd Angry Shot, by William Nagle based on his own experience in 3 Squadron SAS Australian Army, portrays the boredom, mateship, humour, and fear of a group of Australian soldiers deployed to South Vietnam in the late 1960s. The 1975 book was made into a movie of the same name released in 1979.

References 

1975 non-fiction books
Vietnam War books
Australian autobiographical novels
Military history of Australia during the Vietnam War
Angus & Robertson books